In number theory, the sum of squares function is an arithmetic function that gives the number of representations for a given positive integer  as the sum of  squares, where representations that differ only in the order of the summands or in the signs of the numbers being squared are counted as different, and is denoted by .

Definition 
The function is defined as

where  denotes the cardinality of a set. In other words,  is the number of ways  can be written as a sum of  squares.

For example,  since  where each sum has two sign combinations, and also  since  with four sign combinations. On the other hand,  because there is no way to represent 3 as a sum of two squares.

Formulae

k = 2 

It is given explicitly by

Using sums, the expression can be written as:

, if all exponents  are even. If one or more  are odd, then .

k = 3 

Gauss proved that for a squarefree number ,

where  denotes the class number of an integer .

There exist extensions of Gauss' formula to arbitrary integer .

k = 4 

The number of ways to represent  as the sum of four squares was due to Carl Gustav Jakob Jacobi and it is eight times the sum of all its divisors which are not divisible by 4, i.e.

Representing , where m is an odd integer, one can express  in terms of the divisor function as follows:

k = 6 

The number of ways to represent  as the sum of six squares is given by

where  is the Kronecker symbol.

k = 8 
Jacobi also found an explicit formula for the case :

Generating function 
The generating function of the sequence  for fixed  can be expressed in terms of the Jacobi theta function:

where

Numerical values 

See also 

Jacobi's four-square theorem
Gauss circle problem

References

External links 

Arithmetic functions
Squares in number theory
Integer factorization algorithms